Frieseinae is a subfamily of springtails in the family Neanuridae. There are 4 genera and more than 200 described species in Frieseinae.

Genera
 Friesea Dalla Torre, 1895
 Gisinea Massoud, 1965
 Halofriesea Yoshii & Sawada, 1997
 Tremoisea Cassagnau, 1973

References

Neanuridae
Arthropod subfamilies